Assouline Publishing is a book publisher and luxury lifestyle company founded in 1994 by Prosper and Martine Assouline. It has published more than 1,700 titles on subjects including architecture, art, design, fashion, gastronomy, lifestyle, photography, and travel. Beginning in the 2010s the company has branched out to designing, producing, and selling furniture, accessories, and luxury gifts, and to creating bespoke furnished and accessorized libraries for individuals and hotels.

History

The publishing house began as a family company in the basement of Martine and Prosper’s apartment in Paris. One year later, the firm opened its first office on rue Danielle Casanova in Paris. The couple’s first published book was La Colombe d'Or (1994) which covers the history of their favorite hotel in the South of France, including photographs by Prosper and text by Martine.

The company went on to establish its first book series in 1996 – the Memoire collection, which was composed of books focusing on individuals and companies in fashion, jewelry, design, and art. Initial publications included books on Alaïa, Chanel, Vionnet, and Dior. The collection was available in 10 different languages and has sold millions of copies worldwide.

In 2007, the company owners relocated to New York City, and that same year they began to partner with the Council of Fashion Designers of America. In 2011 Prosper Assouline was awarded the Chevalier des Arts et des Lettres from the French Ministry of Culture for his work in publishing. In 2012, Assouline produced a waterproof book on the subject of the South Pole, as well as Gaia, a book of photos taken on the International Space Station by Guy Laliberté. In 2016, the French Institute Alliance Française awarded the Assoulines with the Art de Vivre award for their publications.

In 2013, LVMH acquired a minority stake in the company. By 2020, Assouline had published more than 1,700 books.

As of the 2020s, Assouline is known for its collections, including its extensive and colorful travel series, its Handcrafted Ultimates collection, its Classics collection, and its signed limited editions such as the special edition of its book on Versailles.

Martine and Prosper's son Alex has been at the company since 2014. As of 2022 he is chief of operations, brand, and strategy.

Boutiques and flagship stores
In 2003, Assouline opened a corner boutique in Bergdorf Goodman. The company opened its first standalone boutique in Paris in 2006. Assouline has opened several flagship stores, including a London store entitled Maison Assouline that opened in 2014, which includes a restaurant called the Swans Bar. The company has subsequently opened numerous branded corners inside venues in Spain, Monaco, South Africa, Ukraine, Greece, Bolivia, Manila, and elsewhere.

Luxury lifestyle brand
Since 2011 the company has also been building itself into a luxury lifestyle brand. In addition to books, Maison Assouline in London sells furniture, rare objects, and luxury gifts, and some of Assouline's stores in other locations do as well.

In 2015, Assouline launched an "Haute Couture" furnishings collection called "Assouline Interiors." Assouline also produces accessories, bookbags, and bindery.

Assouline has collaborated with global luxury brands including Zara, Oliver Peoples, and Gucci.

The company also creates custom libraries for individuals and hotels including interior design, furniture, vintage objects, and accessories. In New York City they have designed private libraries and lounges in buildings including 432 Park, 550 Madison Avenue, The Caledonia, and The Shephard.

References

External links

1994 establishments in New York (state)
Book publishing companies based in New York (state)
Luxury brands
Publishing companies based in New York City
Publishing companies established in 1994